The 2017–18 NBL season was the 40th season of the National Basketball League since its establishment in 1979. A total of eight teams contested the league. The regular season was played between October 2017 and February 2018, followed by a post-season featuring the top four in March 2018.

Australian broadcast rights to the season were held by Fox Sports, in the third year of a five-year deal, with two games per week simulcast on SBS. In New Zealand, Sky Sport were the official league broadcaster.

As Australia and New Zealand participated in 2019 FIBA Basketball World Cup qualification, the league took a break during the newly created FIBA international windows of 20–28 November 2017 and 19–27 February 2018.

Pre-season

2017 NBL All-Australian Tour of China 

China won the series 2-1.

Adelaide 36ers pre-season

2017 Merlion Cup

Semi-final

Final 

Adelaide 36ers won the tournament.

Brisbane Bullets pre-season

Cairns Taipans pre-season

Illawarra Hawks pre-season

Melbourne United pre-season

New Zealand Breakers pre-season

Perth Wildcats pre-season

Sydney Kings pre-season 
2017 International Basketball Championships

Semi-final

Final 

Sydney Kings won the tournament.

2017 NBL Blitz 
A pre-season tournament featuring all eight teams was held on 7–9 September 2017 in Traralgon, Victoria and on 10 September 2017 in Melbourne. The winners received the fifth annual Loggins-Bruton Cup.

Melbourne United won the 2017 NBL Blitz championship.

Regular season

Round 1

Round 2

Round 3

Round 4

Round 5

Round 6

Round 7

Round 8

Round 9

Round 10

Round 11

Round 12

Round 13

Round 14

Round 15

Round 16

Round 17

Round 18

Round 19

Ladder

The NBL tie-breaker system as outlined in the NBL Rules and Regulations states that in the case of an identical win–loss record, the overall points percentage between the teams will determine order of seeding.

1Cairns Taipans won on overall points percentage.

Finals 

The 2017–18 National Basketball League Finals were played in March 2018, consisting of two best-of-three semi-final series and the best-of-five Grand Final series. In the semi-finals, the higher seed hosted the first and third games. In the Grand Final, the higher seed hosted the first, third and fifth games.

Playoff Seedings 
 Melbourne United
 Adelaide 36ers
 Perth Wildcats
 New Zealand Breakers

The NBL tie-breaker system as outlined in the NBL Rules and Regulations states that in the case of an identical win–loss record, the overall points percentage will determine order of seeding.

Playoff bracket

Semi-finals 
(1) Melbourne United vs. (4) New Zealand Breakers

(2) Adelaide 36ers vs. (3) Perth Wildcats

Grand Final 
(1) Melbourne United vs. (2) Adelaide 36ers

Awards

Pre-season
 Most Valuable Player (Ray Borner Medal): Travis Trice (Brisbane Bullets)

Season
 Most Valuable Player (Andrew Gaze Trophy): Bryce Cotton (Perth Wildcats)
 Rookie of the Year: Isaac Humphries (Sydney Kings)
 Best Defensive Player: Damian Martin (Perth Wildcats)
 Best Sixth Man: Ramone Moore (Adelaide 36ers)
 Most Improved Player: Shea Ili (New Zealand Breakers)
 Fans MVP: Mitch Creek (Adelaide 36ers)
 Coach of the Year (Lindsay Gaze Trophy): Dean Vickerman (Melbourne United)
 Referee of the Year: Michael Aylen
 All-NBL First Team: 
 Casper Ware (Melbourne United) 
 Bryce Cotton (Perth Wildcats) 
 Demitrius Conger (Illawarra Hawks) 
 Daniel Johnson (Adelaide 36ers) 
 Josh Boone (Melbourne United)
 All-NBL Second Team: 
 Jerome Randle (Sydney Kings) 
 Édgar Sosa (New Zealand Breakers) 
 JP Tokoto (Perth Wildcats) 
 Mitch Creek (Adelaide 36ers) 
 Tai Wesley (Melbourne United)

Finals
 Grand Final Series MVP (Larry Sengstock Medal): Chris Goulding (Melbourne United)

References 

 
Australia,NBL
2017–18 in Australian basketball
2017 in New Zealand basketball